Grand Beach is a freshwater beach located within the Rural Municipality of St. Clements on the eastern shore of Lake Winnipeg in Manitoba, Canada. It is located on the northern edge of the town of Grand Marais, Manitoba. Grand Beach is on the historic La Vérendrye Trail
.

History

Founded by homesteaders, it was home to a substantial community of Métis, who were the only settlers until the Canadian Northern Railway built its line and set up the resort along the Grand Beach in 1917. After it was made accessible by the railway, it became a very popular resort for Manitobans.

In the early days, the grandest building in the resort was the Dance Pavilion, built in 1918 and rated by some as the largest dance hall of its time in the Commonwealth, but it was destroyed in a fire that began at 11 am on September 5, 1950. Prior to the fire, CNR had put the resort buildings up for sale. Along with the incredible beaches, the dance hall made Grand Beach a very attractive day trip destination for Winnipeggers in the 1920s, that was made possible by regular train services to Winnipeg, with the last train leaving at midnight. A Harvey J. Emke of Winnipeg bought the properties from CNR in 1951.

Sites and attractions
A boardwalk at the West end of the beach offers food and shopping. Change rooms and plumbed washrooms are available all along the beach.

Annual events
Canada Day Family Festival
Grand Marais Family Festival
Manitoba Summerfest
Beaches Half Marathon

References

External links
Grand Beach Tourism
Manitoba Conservation
Eastern Beaches of Manitoba
Manitoba Historical Society
Website of Great Canadian Lakes

Beaches of Manitoba
Winnipeg Metro Region